Rex Morgan may refer to:

 Rex Morgan, M.D., American comic strip
 Rex Morgan (basketball) (1948–2016), American former basketball player
 Rex Henry Morgan, founder of The Pittwater House Schools

Morgan, Rex